Ophioarachnicola is a genus of parasitic sea snails, marine gastropod mollusks in the family Eulimidae.

Species
 Ophioarachnicola biformis Warén, 1980

References

 Warén A. (1980) Descriptions of new taxa of Eulimidae (Mollusca, Prosobranchia), with notes on some previously described genera. Zoologica Scripta 9: 283-306.

External links
 To World Register of Marine Species

Eulimidae